This is a list of countries by household final consumption expenditure per capita, that is, the market value of all goods and services, including durable products (such as cars, washing machines, and home computers), purchased by households during one year, divided by the country's average (or mid-year) population for the same year. It excludes purchases of dwellings but includes imputed rent for owner-occupied dwellings. It also includes payments and fees to governments to obtain permits and licenses. Here, household consumption expenditure includes the expenditures of nonprofit institutions serving households, even when reported separately by the country. The latest figures for each country and territory are shown.

See also
Gross domestic product

References

Household Final Consumption
Household Final Consumption
Household Final Consumption